Chinese Italian or Italian Chinese may refer to:
Chinese people in Italy
Italians in China, such as:
People's Republic of China-Italy relations
Republic of China-Italy relations
Mixed race people of Chinese and Italian descent